Buranovskiye Babushki (both meaning "Buranovo Grannies") is an Udmurt-Russian ethno-pop band comprising eight elderly women from the village of Buranovo, Udmurtia. Buranovskiye Babushki represented Russia at the Eurovision Song Contest 2012 in Baku, Azerbaijan, where they finished second.

History

Eurovision Song Contest 
The group had previously participated on Russia's Eurovision song selection in 2010 with the song "Dlinnaja-dlinnaja beresta i kak sdelat' iz nee ajšon" ("Very long birch bark and how to turn it into a turban"), where they finished third.

They made another attempt to represent Russia by participating on Russia's Eurovision song selection in 2012 with the song "Party for Everybody" which was sung partially in English. The group eventually won, receiving 38.51 points ahead of Eurovision 2008 winner Dima Bilan who also entered the contest with T.A.T.u. member Yulia Volkova with the song "Back To Her Future" which finished second, receiving 29.25 points. They represented Russia in the Eurovision Song Contest 2012 in Baku, Azerbaijan. The group finished in 2nd place with 259 points, receiving points from 40 countries out of eligible 41 (excluding Switzerland), and were behind the winning country, Sweden, who scored 372 points.

The group said that in 2012 they would use any money raised to build a church in Buranovo.

Fundraising for church rebuilding 

In 2010, the group started a fund for the rebuilding of Trinity Church in Buranovo and all of the group's income is donated into this fund. The Trinity Church was originally built, of stone, in 1865, but was closed on 19 September 1939 by the Soviet administration and demolished. The present wooden church is in poor condition.

The brick structure of The Holy Trinity church has been completed. Outside walls are white concrete stucco, and the roof is green metal. The interior is still under construction in early 2014. A stone monument was placed near the church which has a plaque reads (in Russian): "By the Grace of God and hard labour of the music group Buranovskie Grandmothers, on this place will be built a temple to honour the Holy Trinity. This stone was laid 28 October 2011."

The church was finally opened and consecrated on 20 June 2016.

Members 
In 2014, Producer Ksenia Rubtsova ended the contract with the original grandmothers and recruited a new line-up of 8 primary grandmothers, including Anna Prokopyeva and Valentina Serebrennikova, and 12 back-up grandmothers. The new grandmothers are from a variety of villages in Udmurt. The former grandmothers continue to perform under the name "Бабушки из Бураново" (Grandmothers from Buranovo).  
 Grania Baysarova (born 1949)
 Alevtina Begisheva (born 1958)
 Zoya Dorodova (born 1940)
 Valentina Pyatchenko (born 1937)
 Ekaterina Shklyaeva (born 1937)
 Olga Tuktareva (born 1968)
 Nikolay Zarbatov (born 1963 or 1964)

Former 
 Elizaveta Zarbatova (1926–2014)
 Natalya Pugacheva (1935–2019)
 Galina Koneva (born 1938)

Critical reception 
Russian critics noted that the success of "Buranovskiye Babushki" on Eurovision-2012 was influenced by Russians acts like "Ivan Kupala".

References

External links 

 

Eurovision Song Contest entrants of 2012
People from Udmurtia
Russian folk music groups
Eurovision Song Contest entrants for Russia
Udmurt music
Udmurt people